Paul Victor Louis Zipser (born 18 February 1994) is a German professional basketball player for Bayern Munich of the Basketball Bundesliga (BBL) and the EuroLeague. Standing at 2.03 m (6 ft 8 in), he plays at the small forward position. He was selected by the Chicago Bulls with the 48th overall pick in the 2016 NBA draft.

Professional career

Heidelberg (2010–2012)
Zipser began his professional career in his hometown with USC Heidelberg in 2010. In 2011–12, he averaged 7.9 points, 3 rebounds and 1.2 assists per game. He managed just two games for Heidelberg in 2012–13 due to injury.

Bayern Munich (2013–2016) 
On 18 January 2013, Zipser signed a four-year deal with Bayern Munich.

On 21 April 2015, Zipser entered the 2015 NBA draft as an early-entrant, only to withdraw from it later.

In 2015–16, Zipser played 40 league games for Bayern Munich, averaging 7.1 points, 3.6 rebounds and 1.4 assists in 18.5 minutes per game. For the season, he was named the League's Best German Young Player.

In June 2016, Zipser attended the Adidas Eurocamp, a basketball camp based in Treviso for the NBA Draft prospects. He was named the Eurocamp 2016 MVP.

Chicago Bulls (2016–2018)
On 23 June 2016, Zipser was selected by the Chicago Bulls with the 48th overall pick in the 2016 NBA draft. On 15 July, he signed with the Bulls. On 12 January 2017, in just his 11th appearance of the season, Zipser made his first career start in the Bulls' 104–89 loss to the New York Knicks; he had a then season-high seven points. On 22 March, he scored a career-high 15 points in a 117–95 win over the Detroit Pistons. In the Bulls' regular-season finale on 12 April, Zipser set a new career high with 21 points in a 112–73 win over the Brooklyn Nets. During his rookie season, he has received multiple assignments to the Windy City Bulls, Chicago's D-League affiliate.

Throughout 2017–18 season, he received very little playing time due to the Bulls' front office trying to develop other young talents. He was sent down to their G-League affiliate, the Windy City Bulls on several occasions. Zipser began seeing more playing time during the middle of the season. On 18 May 2018, Zipser was reported to have surgery in repairing a broken left foot. On 14 July, he was waived by the Bulls.

San Pablo Burgos (2019)
After being close to signing with the Brooklyn Nets according to media reports in January 2019, Zipser moved to Spanish Liga ACB side San Pablo Burgos on 17 January 2019.

Return to Bayern Munich (2019–present) 
On August 5, 2019, Zipser signed with Bayern Munich of the Basketball Bundesliga (BBL).

National team career
Zipser has been a member of the German national under-16 and under-18 teams. He played in the 2010 FIBA Europe Under-16 Championship, 2011 and 2012 FIBA Europe Under-18 Championship. In 2012 he also played in Albert Schweitzer Tournament and was named to the All-Tournament Team, averaging 14.6 points, 5 rebounds and 2.3 assists per game.

On 30 July 2015, Zipser made his debut for the Germany national basketball team in a game against Austria. During FIBA EuroBasket 2015, he averaged 5.2 points, 5.2 rebounds and 1.8 assists per game.

Personal life
During EuroBasket 2015, Zipser raised controversy by refusing to sign an autograph for Vuk Ivanović, a boy of Serbian descent who was wearing a Serbian jersey, who claimed he wants to sell the autograph later. However, Zipser gave an autographed game-worn jersey and shorts to Saint Sava Serbian Orthodox Church for a special raffle at 2018 SerbFest in Merrillville, Indiana.

Career statistics

NBA

Regular season

|-
| style="text-align:left;"| 
| style="text-align:left;"| Chicago
| 44 || 18 || 19.2 || .398 || .333 || .775 || 2.8 || .8 || .3 || .4 || 5.5
|-
| style="text-align:left;"| 
| style="text-align:left;"| Chicago
| 54 || 12 || 15.3 || .346 || .336 || .760 || 2.4 || .9 || .4 || .3 || 4.0
|-
| style="text-align:center;" colspan="2"| Career
| 98 || 30 || 17.0 || .371 || .335 || .769 || 2.6 || .8 || .4 || .3 || 4.7

Playoffs

|-
| style="text-align:left;"| 2017
| style="text-align:left;"| Chicago
| 6 || 0 || 22.7 || .455 || .375 || 1.000 || 3.5 || .5 || .2 || .2 || 7.3
|- 
| style="text-align:center;" colspan="2"| Career
| 6 || 0 || 22.7 || .455 || .375 || 1.000 || 3.5 || .5 || .2 || .2 || 7.3

EuroLeague

|-
| style="text-align:left;"| 2013–14
| style="text-align:left;"| Bayern
| 5 || 0 || 7.7 || .385 || .333 || 1.000 || 1.0 || .6 || .0 || .0 || 4.2 || 2.8
|-
| style="text-align:left;"| 2014–15
| style="text-align:left;"| Bayern
| 3 || 1 || 12.7 || .500 || .500 || .000 || 1.7 || .3 || .3 || .3 || 3.3 || 1.7
|-
| style="text-align:left;"| 2015–16
| style="text-align:left;"| Bayern
| 10 || 1 || 15.2 || .636 || .278 || 1.000 || 3.1 || 1.2 || .4 || .7 || 5.3 || 7.1
|- class="sortbottom"
| style="text-align:center;" colspan="2"| Career
| 18 || 2 || 12.7 || .538 || .320 || 1.000 || 2.3 || .3 || .9 || .4 || 4.7 || 5.0

References

External links

 
 Paul Zipser at euroleague.net

1994 births
2019 FIBA Basketball World Cup players
CB Miraflores players
Chicago Bulls draft picks
Chicago Bulls players
FC Bayern Munich basketball players
German expatriate basketball people in Spain
German expatriate basketball people in the United States
German men's basketball players
Liga ACB players
Living people
National Basketball Association players from Germany
Sportspeople from Heidelberg
Power forwards (basketball)
Small forwards
USC Heidelberg players
Windy City Bulls players